The Kuwait Super Cup is an annual one-match association football competition in Kuwait organised by Kuwait Football Association (KFA). This competition serves as the season opener and is played between the Kuwaiti Premier League champions and the Kuwait Emir Cup winners of the previous season. The first game was played in 2008.

Competition Rules
 League champions versus Emir's Cup winners, or Crown Prince Cup winners if one team won both League and Emir Cup in a single season.
 One-legged match 90 minutes. If tied after 90 minutes, no extra time is added on, and it goes straight to a penalty shoot-out.

Results

Notes
 ^ Premier League champions, Kuwait Emir Cup winners and Kuwait Crown Prince Cup winners.
 * Premier League champions and Kuwait Emir Cup winners.
 # Kuwait Crown Prince Cup winners.
 ~ Premier League Runners-up.

Performances

Performances by club

logos

References

External links 

 
Kuwait
Super
Recurring sporting events established in 2008
2008 establishments in Kuwait